Carl Dobson (born 31 January 1983), better known by his stage name Crazy Titch, is a British grime MC who is now serving a life sentence for murder. Crazy Titch was a successful and well-known grime MC during his active period.

Early life and education
Dobson was born in Plaistow, East London. As a teenager Dobson spent five years in Feltham and Aylesbury Young Offenders' Institute for robbery, handling stolen goods, theft, burglary and criminal damage; On his release in 2003 Dobson turned his attention to grime music. Dobson became estranged from his brother, Durrty Goodz, during his childhood, but they later reconnected and became musical collaborators.

Career
He gained underground fame due to his membership of grime collective Boyz In Da Hood, which included various artists including half-brother Durrty Goodz. Amongst his better known work was "Sing Along" (2004) and "Gully" on which he collaborated with Sugababes' Keisha Buchanan. He also produced a mixtape entitled Crazy Times Vol.1, and appeared on the grime DVD Practice Hours. In 2006 he made an appearance as himself along with many other MCs on the Channel 4 show Dubplate Drama. Crazy Titch had a reputation for violence during his time in the grime scene. Notorious footage exists of a heated argument between Crazy Titch and Dizzee Rascal and of Crazy Titch allegedly kidnapping a rival and dumping them naked in the countryside.

Imprisonment
Dobson and his stepfather Anthony Green were sentenced to life imprisonment for the murder of 21-year-old Richard Holmes on the Chingford Hall estate in Chingford in November 2005. Possibility for parole was set at a minimum of 30 years by which time he will be in his 50s. Durrty Goodz was acquitted in the same trial and released a song about its events entitled Letter 2 Titch in 2007. The MAC-10 submachine gun used in the murder was found four years after the killing; in February 2009 a local drug dealer was sentenced to seven years imprisonment for its possession.
In 2010 he released his second mixtape, a sequel to 2005's Crazy Times, with the material having been recorded while incarcerated. In 2017, Titch appeared on an interlude on Stormzy's album Gang Signs & Prayer, talking to Stormzy over the phone.

In 2020, a lyric video was produced, titled "Voldemort," which included new audio from Titch. It was uploaded to YouTube to celebrate Titch's birthday in 2020.

Discography

Mixtapes
2005: Crazy Times, Vol. 1
2010: Crazy Times, Vol. 2

Singles 
2003: "I Can C U"
2004: "Sing Along"
2020: "Voldemort"
2020: "Puff Chest"

Appeared on 
2004: Aim High Volume 1 by Danny Weed and Target
2005: Aim High Volume 2 by Danny Weed and Target
2009: Hardrive by Terror Danjah
2010: Born Blessed by Durrty Goodz
2011: Porridge by Stanaman
2017: Gang Signs & Prayer by Stormzy

References

1983 births
Living people
21st-century British criminals
Black British male rappers
British robbers
Grime music artists
English people convicted of murder
English people of Saint Lucian descent
English prisoners sentenced to life imprisonment
People convicted of murder by England and Wales
People from Plaistow, Newham
Prisoners sentenced to life imprisonment by England and Wales
Rappers from London